Manju Kumari Yadav is a Nepalese politician. She is a member of Provincial Assembly of Madhesh Province from CPN (Unified Socialist). Yadav is a resident of Bhangaha, Mahottari.

References

Living people
1982 births
Madhesi people
21st-century Nepalese women politicians
21st-century Nepalese politicians
Members of the Provincial Assembly of Madhesh Province
Communist Party of Nepal (Unified Socialist) politicians